USS Snowdrop, originally named Albert DeGroat and occasionally referred to as A. DeGroat was a screw tug built in 1863 at Buffalo, New York.  Albert DeGroat was purchased by the United States Navy at New York City on 16 October 1863; renamed Snowdrop; and was fitted out at the New York Navy Yard.

After service at New York into the spring of 1864, Snowdrop was assigned to the North Atlantic Blockading Squadron and ordered to Hampton Roads on 2 May. She served in the North Atlantic Blockading Squadron through the last two years of the American Civil War and apparently operated exclusively in the Hampton Roads area. After peace was restored, she remained at the Norfolk Navy Yard through the reconstruction years. She was ordered to New York sometime in the second half of 1883 and was broken up at the New York Navy Yard in 1884.

See also

Union Navy

References

Ships of the Union Navy
Ships built in Buffalo, New York
Steamships of the United States Navy
Tugs of the United States Navy
Gunboats of the United States Navy
American Civil War patrol vessels of the United States
New York (state) in the American Civil War
History of Buffalo, New York
1863 ships